This is an alphabetical list of the 2,136 municipalities of Switzerland, updated.

References

External links
 Official list of municipalities of Switzerland in Excel

List
 
Municipalities